Triple Riding is a 2022 Indian Kannada-language romantic comedy film directed by Mahesh Gowda and starring Ganesh, Aditi Prabhudeva, Megha Shetty and Rachana Inder. The film released mixed reviews from critics.

Plot 
Ram is a vagabond, who works in various job fields and lives a happy life with his father, an advocate. One day, Ram meets Ramya, the daughter of a rich businessman Devendra Shetty. The two gradually fall in love with each other. Later, Ramya ask Ram to help her friend Dr. Rakshitha elope from her father MLA Soorappa, who is fixing a wedding alliance with Home Minister's son Rahul. Ram relucantly agrees and masquerades as Dr. Mahesh and joins a hospital, where Rakshitha is working. Having helped Rakshitha escape from her family, Ram learns that Ramya never loved him and used him to help her reunite with Rahul, as both of them are in love with each other. Rakshitha also elopes with her boyfriend Dr. Prem, a surgeon. Thrown in a fix, Ram escapes to Ooty to stay with his father's friend Suryanarayana, where he meets Radhika, Suryanarayana's daughter. Radhika becomes friends with Ram and learns about his problems. When Radhika proposes to Ram, he rejects her, but later accepts after seeing her willingness to sacrifice herself for him. Later, a comedic sequences ensues where Ram clears Soorappa and Shetty's misunderstandings, and he and Radhika get married happily.

Cast 

Ganesh as Ram/Dr. Mahesh
Aditi Prabhudeva as Ramya Shetty
Megha Shetty as Dr. Rakshitha
Rachana Inder as Radhika
Sharath Lohithaswa as MLA Surappa
Achyuth Kumar as Ram's father
Sadhu Kokila as Garuda
Shobaraj as Shetty 
Rangayana Raghu as Suryanarayana, Ram's father's friend and a realtor
Ravishankar Gowda
P. Ravishankar as Annaiah
Kuri Prathap
Aravind Bolar
Chitkala Biradar
Dingri Nagaraj
M. S. Umesh
Aniruddha Jatkar as Dr.Prem, Dr.Rakshitha's Husband

Soundtrack 
The songs are composed by Sai Karthik.
"Yatta Yatta" - Chandan Shetty, Mangli
"Sotheya Hrudaya" - Anuradha Bhat
"Ee Hosa Sudina" - Anuradha Bhat
"Twinkle Twinkle Little Star" - Vijay Prakash
"Nijave Athava" - Sonu Nigam
"Triple Riding Theme Music 1" - N.a
"Triple Riding Theme Music 2" - Ganesh

Reception 
A critic from Deccan Herald wrote that "Triple Riding is a film that makes you go numb with its sheer lack of freshness". A critic from The Hindu wrote that "Triple Riding has nothing new to offer. There is an overdose of comedy, and the story is just another take on love and heartbreak". A critic from OTT Play wrote that "This is a ride that you may want to miss. Triple Riding is an offence, you see!" 

A critic from Bangalore Mirror wrote that "All in all, Triple Riding is worth a watch for all audiences". A critic from The Times of India wrote that "For those who love comedy films, this would be a perfect weekend treat". A critic from The New Indian Express wrote that "Overall, Tribble Riding is a tasteful comedy entertainer and an equally good romance. Interestingly this fun film has an underline message too".

References